State Route 561 (SR 561) is a north–south state highway in the southwestern portion of the U.S. state of Ohio. The route takes many different names along its length, being first known as Linwood Avenue, Observatory Avenue, and Edwards Road in Cincinnati; then it is named Smith Road and Carthage Avenue as it passes through Norwood; its final stretch in Cincinnati once again is as Seymour Avenue.

Route description
No part of SR 561 in Ohio is included as a part of the National Highway System (NHS).  The NHS is a network of highways that are identified as being most important for the economy, mobility and defense of the nation.

SR 561 heads north from the southern terminus at an interchange with US 50.  The route heads northwest turning north towards Interstate 71.  After I–71, the road has a short concurrency with US 22/SR 3 in Norwood.  The road heads towards the northern terminus at Vine Street, passing through a traffic light at SR 4 (Paddock Road) just south of exit 9 of I–75.

History
In 1938, the original route was certified. SR 561 was then extended to the south to its current terminus on a former segment of U.S. Route 50 in 1941. In 1947, the northern terminus was moved one mile (1.6 km) north of State Route 4. It was moved along a road that was previously not numbered.

Major intersections

References

External links

561
Transportation in Hamilton County, Ohio
Roads in Cincinnati